The 1998 Invercargill mayoral election was held on 10 October 1998 as part of the 1998 New Zealand local elections, and was conducted under the First Past the Post system.

Background
Former mayor Tim Shadbolt reclaimed the mayoralty he lost to David Harrington in the previous election. This was the beginning of a decades-long stint as mayor for Shadbolt. Shadbolt had considered contesting the Queenstown mayoralty before deciding to run in Invercargill again. Shadbolt once campaigned on Esk Street standing on a literal Lux soapbox. Harrington cleared out his desk two days before the election, apparently resigned to his impending loss.

Polling

Results
The following table gives the election results:

References

1998 elections in New Zealand
Mayoral elections in Invercargill
October 1998 events in New Zealand